Kyungnam High School is a college preparatory high school in Busan, South Korea.

History
Kyungnam High School was constructed in 1942, while Korea was under Japanese rule, as the name of Second Public Middle School of Busan. After the colonial rule ended on August 15, 1945, it reopened and continued its operation from October 1945, and was then renamed as Kyungnam Public Middle School in March 1946. During the Korean War, it was separated into First High School of Busan and West Middle School of Busan in August 1951. First High School of Busan held its first graduation ceremony in March 1952, still during the war. It got its current name in August 1953.

Athletics
Kyungnam High School owns one of the best highschool baseball teams in Republic of Korea. The team was established in 1945 and won several major national championships in South Korea. There are many alumni who are previous and current players in the Korea Professional Baseball League.

Notable alumni
Moon Jae-in, current president of South Korea
Kim Young-sam, former president of South Korea
Kwon Young-ghil, politician of South Korea
Lee Dae-ho, current third baseman for Lotte Giants
Song Seung-jun, current pitcher for Lotte Giants
 Park Sung-Jin, leader of DAY6
Choi Dong-won, pitcher for Lotte Giants

References 

High schools in South Korea
Schools in Busan
Seo District, Busan
Educational institutions established in 1942
1942 establishments in Korea